Barney Boomer was a Canadian children's television series which aired on CBC Television for part of the 1967-1968 programming season. Vancouver actor John Clayton portrayed the title character.

Production
The programme was produced under the network's Schools and Youth division and filmed on location in Oakville, Ontario. The series aired four days per week from Tuesdays through Fridays as a replacement for Razzle Dazzle. Each episode aired from 16:30 Toronto time for 20 minutes followed by a short quiz show, Swingaround, which completed the half-hour time slot.

In January 1968, Barney Boomer was replaced by Upside Town, a series which retained most of the cast but with a reformulated premise which gave more emphasis to characters other than Barney. Lynne Gorman did not continue her role as Florence Kozy; her character was performed by Pam Hyatt in the new series.

Premise
Barney Boomer is a 21-year-old sailor who docked his houseboat at Sixteen Harbour in the fictional town of Cedarville, intending to meet his uncle (Rex Sevenoaks), a captain who lived in a lighthouse. Barney intended the stay at Cedarville to be brief, due to his plans to navigate the Great Lakes, However, he meets Florence Kozy (Lynne Gorman), who persuades him to establish a business in the town.

Cast
 John Clayton - Barney Boomer
 Lynne Gorman - Florence Kozy
 Franz Russell - Councillor Edgar Q. Russell
 Trudy Young - Trudy
 Rex Sevenoaks - Captain Boomer
 Claire Drainie - Ma Parkin
 Claude Rae - Mr. Andrews
 Gerard Parkes - Sam Oliver
 Belinda Montgomery - Susan

References

External links
 Barney Boomer at the Canadian Communications Foundation
 Queen's University Directory of CBC Television Series (Barney Boomer archived listing link via archive.org)
 

1967 Canadian television series debuts
1968 Canadian television series endings
CBC Television original programming
1960s Canadian children's television series
Television shows filmed in Ontario